Törökfalu is the Hungarian name for two places:
 Buciumi village, Şomcuta Mare town, Maramureș County, Romania
 Utrine, Serbia